Jeanine Assani Issouf (born 17 August 1992) is a French athlete whose specialty is the triple jump. She competed at the 2015 World Championships in Beijing finishing ninth.

Her personal bests in the event are 14.40 metres outdoors (2016 French National Championships) and 14.13 metres indoors (Aubière 2015).

On 19 March 2016, Assani-Issouf finished 7th in the final of World Indoor Championships at Portland with a jump of 14.07m. On 6 May, she bettered her personal best to 14.26 m at the 2016 IAAF Diamond League in Doha where she finished 4th.

On 26 June 2016, she won her first French Outdoor Championship with a jump of 14.40 m, a personal best.

Issouf is originally from the island of Mayotte.

Competition record

References

External links
 

1992 births
Living people
French female triple jumpers
World Athletics Championships athletes for France
Sportspeople from Marseille
Athletes (track and field) at the 2016 Summer Olympics
Olympic athletes of France
Mayotte sportspeople
20th-century French women
21st-century French women
Athletes (track and field) at the 2022 Mediterranean Games